Dagoretti South Constituency is an electoral constituency in Kenya. It is one of seventeen constituencies of Nairobi County. It is located to the west of Nairobi. The entire constituency is located within Nairobi County. The constituency was known as Nairobi West Constituency from 1963 to 1969, and Dagoretti Constituency from 1969 to 2013.

Before the general election of 2013, Dagoretti Constituency was divided, with the bulk of the southern parts forming Dagoretti South Constituency; the south-east stretch combined with part of Lang'ata Constituency to form Kibra Constituency; the rest was combined with part of Westlands Constituency to form Dagoretti North Constituency.

The area member of parliament is John Kiarie (KJ)

Members of Parliament

Locations and wards

References

External links 
Map of the constituency
Uchaguzikenya.com - Constituency profile

Constituencies in Nairobi
2013 establishments in Kenya
Constituencies established in 2013